The 1968–69 Rheinlandliga was the 17th season of the highest amateur class of the Rhineland Football Association under the name of 1. Amateurliga Rheinland. It was a predecessor of today's Rheinlandliga.

Results
Rhineland champion was last year's champion SSV Mülheim. SV Niederlahnstein participated as a Rhineland representative in the German football amateur championship 1969, failed there, in the round of the last 16, to the South Baden representative FC Emmendingen.

The relegation into the 2. Amateur League was made by Sportfreunde Herdorf, VfB Wissen, SV Ruwer and TuS Mayen. For the following 1969–70 season, VfL Trier, FV Engers and SC Oberlahnstein moved up from the 2. Amateur League.

References

1968 in association football
Football in Rhineland-Palatinate
1969 in association football